Praise Fowowe is a Nigerian speaker, author, sex educator and child abuse activist. He is the founder of Centre for Sex Education and Family Life.

Fowowe is the Principal consultant of Praise Fowowe International as well as the founder of The Institute of Family Engineering & Development Africa.

References 

21st-century Nigerian writers
Living people
Nigerian activists
21st-century Nigerian educators
Year of birth missing (living people)